Hárrison Steve Henao Hurtado (born February 19, 1987) is a Colombian footballer who currently plays as a midfielder for Colombian side Once Caldas.

Club career
Hárrison Henao began his career in the youth ranks of Deportivo Rionegro. He then moved to Manizales club Once Caldas and in 2010 made his first team debut for the club in Colombia's Primera A.

On April 11, 2012, Henao signed a loan deal with the Colorado Rapids of Major League Soccer.

References

External links
 
 

1987 births
Living people
Colombian footballers
Colombian expatriate footballers
Once Caldas footballers
Colorado Rapids players
Expatriate soccer players in the United States
Major League Soccer players
Association football midfielders
Sportspeople from Antioquia Department